The Lukang Longshan Temple is a Guanyin temple in Lukang Township, Changhua County, Taiwan.

History
The temple was originally constructed in 1738 as a small temple. It was then later remodeled by local residents to a larger scale. The much expanded incarnation seen today is renowned for its exquisite woodcarvings, as well as for its stone sculptures, a noteworthy example of which are the 12 major support columns in the main hall, twined by auspicious dragons hewn from solid stone. In 1999, the temple was damaged by an earthquake. It was then repaired and reopened in 2008.

Architecture
The temple spans over an area of 891 m2. The temple is a square building, with its main building consists of four strata and three gardens. A pair of granite dragon pole sits at the front of the gate. At the end of front hall, there is a theater stage for traditional plays at festivals.

Transportation
The temple is accessible south west from Changhua Station of Taiwan Railways.

See also
 Bangka Lungshan Temple
 Fengshan Longshan Temple
 List of tourist attractions in Taiwan

References

1653 establishments in Taiwan
Buddhist temples in Taiwan
National monuments of Taiwan
Religious buildings and structures completed in 1653
Temples in Changhua County